Helodus (from  , 'stud' and   'tooth') is an extinct genus of cartilaginous fish from the Upper Devonian through Lower Permian. While the type species, H. simplex is known from an articulated specimen, the rest of the species in this genus are known entirely from isolated teeth. Over twenty species have been attributed to this genus, many of which may be anterior teeth of other cartilaginous fish. This makes Helodus a wastebasket taxon. For this reason, only the type species can be confidently attributed to this genus until articulated remains of other species are found. H. simplex was around 30 centimeters long.

References

Carboniferous cartilaginous fish
Prehistoric cartilaginous fish genera
Taxa named by Louis Agassiz
Paleozoic fish of North America